Yajaw Teʼ Kʼinich I was a Mayan king (ajaw) of Caracol in Belize.

Life
He was probably a son of Kʼahkʼ Ujol Kʼinich I and Lady of Xultun (she was maybe a wife of latter king).

Whereas his predecessors are known only from retrospective texts, this ruler's monuments record a contemporaneous date in AD 487.

His monuments are stelae 13 and 20? and altar 4.

His son was Kʼan I and his grandson was Yajaw Teʼ Kʼinich II.

Sources
Chronicle of the Maya Kings and Queens by Simon Martin and Nikolai Grube

Kings of Caracol
5th century in the Maya civilization
5th-century monarchs in North America